Bickley is an unincorporated community in Ware County, Georgia, United States. It is located northwest of Waycross and is south of Nicholls, Georgia in Coffee County. Bickley is an agricultural community.

History
A post office called Bickley was established in 1881, and remained in operation until 1909. In 1900, the community had 100 inhabitants.

Demographics
In 1900, the community had 100 inhabitants. Bickley was founded just after the 1880 census, and it’s census records from the Census of 1890 were burned. It was disorganized before the Census of 1910, so despite it existing for 28 years, we only have Census data from 1900.

References

Unincorporated communities in Georgia (U.S. state)
Unincorporated communities in Ware County, Georgia
Waycross, Georgia micropolitan area